The 1913–14 season was the ninth in the history of the Isthmian League, an English football competition.

New Crusaders were newly admitted to what would be their only season in the Isthmian League. London Caledonians were champions, winning their fifth Isthmian League title. 

It was the last season before the league was suspended for the First World War. Shepherd's Bush never returned to the league after the war, while four other clubs missed the short 1919 season.

League table

References

Isthmian League seasons
I